Šampanjac is an album of Bosnian Serb singer Mile Kitić. It was released in 2005 under the label Grand Production.

Track listing
 "Šampanjac"
 "Luda devojko"
 "Spomenik"
 "Zapaliću sve"
 "Vidi se"
 "Zavodnica"
 "Ljubav bez pravila"
 "Tatina maza"
 "Žali"
 "Poslednja adresa"
 "Usputne stanice"

Mile Kitić albums
2005 albums
Grand Production albums